Perrys Crossing is a locality of Sydney, in the state of New South Wales, Australia. It is located in the City of Hawkesbury north of St Albans. It lies across Mogo Creek, a tributary of the Macdonald River which flows into the
Hawkesbury River.

Suburbs of Sydney
City of Hawkesbury
Hawkesbury River